William Edward Lea (25 May 1907 – 31 January 1970) of Manchester was a British philatelist who was added to the Roll of Distinguished Philatelists in 1967.

In 1956 he won a gold medal with diamond at Fipex, New York, for his display of the stamps of Great Britain.

References

Signatories to the Roll of Distinguished Philatelists
1907 births
1970 deaths
British philatelists